Biston melacron is a moth of the family Geometridae. It is found in China (Zhejiang, Jiangxi, Fujian, Taiwan, Sichuan), Japan and South Korea.

References

Moths described in 1941
Bistonini
Moths of Japan